Bernal Jiménez is the name of:

Miguel Bernal Jiménez, Mexican composer
Bernal Jiménez Monge, Costa Rican politician